Many species of fish are caught by humans and consumed as food in virtually all regions around the world. Fish has been an important dietary source of protein and other nutrients throughout human history.

The English language does not have a special culinary name for food prepared from fish like with other animals (as with pig vs. pork), or as in other languages (such as Spanish pez vs. pescado). In culinary and fishery contexts, fish may include so-called shellfish such as molluscs, crustaceans, and echinoderms; more expansively, seafood covers both fish and other marine life used as food.

Since 1961, the average annual increase in global apparent food fish consumption (3.2 percent) has outpaced population growth (1.6 percent) and exceeded consumption of meat from all terrestrial animals, combined (2.8 percent) and individually (bovine, ovine, porcine, etc.), except poultry (4.9 percent). The expansion in consumption has been driven not only by increased production, but also by a combination of many other factors, including reduced wastage, better utilization, improved distribution channels and growing consumer demand, linked with population growth, rising disposable incomes and urbanization.

Europe, Japan and the United States of America together accounted for 47 percent of the world's total food fish consumption in 1961, but only about 20 percent in 2015. Of the global total of 149 million tonnes in 2015, Asia consumed more than two-thirds (106 million tonnes at 24.0 kg per capita). Oceania and Africa consumed the lowest share. The shift is the result of structural changes in the sector and in particular the growing role of Asian countries in fish production, as well as a significant gap between the economic growth rates of the world's more mature fish markets and those of many increasingly important emerging markets around the world, particularly in Asia.

Species
Over 32,000 species of fish have been described, making them the most diverse group of vertebrates. In addition, there are many species of shellfish. However, only a small number of species are commonly eaten by humans.

Preparation

Fish can be prepared in a variety of ways. It can be served uncooked (raw food, e.g., sashimi); cured by marinating (e.g., ceviche), pickling (e.g., pickled herring) or smoking (e.g., smoked salmon); or cooked by baking, frying (e.g., fish and chips), grilling, poaching (e.g., court-bouillon) or steaming. Many of the preservation techniques used in different cultures have since become unnecessary but are still performed for their resulting taste and texture when consumed.

The British historian William Radcliffe wrote in Fishing from the Earliest Times:
"The Emperor Domitian (Juvenal, IV.) ordered a special sitting of the Senate to deliberate and advise on a matter of such grave State importance as the best method of cooking a turbot."

Nutritional value

Globally, fish and fish products provide an average of only about 34 calories per capita per day. However, more than as an energy source, the dietary contribution of fish is significant in terms of high-quality, easily digested animal proteins and especially in fighting micronutrient deficiencies. A portion of 150g of fish provides about 50 to 60 percent of an adult's daily protein requirement. Fish proteins are essential in the diet of some densely populated countries where the total protein intake is low, and are particularly important in diets in small island developing States (SIDS).

Intermediate Technology Publications wrote in 1992 that "Fish provides a good source of high quality protein and contains many vitamins and minerals. It may be classed as either whitefish, oily fish, or shellfish. Whitefish, such as haddock and seer, contain very little fat (usually less than 1%) whereas oily fish, such as sardines, contain between 10–25%. The latter, as a result of its high fat content, contain a range of fat-soluble vitamins (A, D, E and K) and essential fatty acids, all of which are vital for the healthy functioning of the body."

Health benefits

Eating oily fish containing long-chain omega-3 fatty acids may reduce systemic inflammation and lower the risk of cardiovascular disease. Increasing intake of omega-3 fatty acids may slightly reduce the risk of a fatal heart attack, but likely has little effect on the overall number of deaths from cardiovascular disease.

Health hazards
Fish bone is the most common food-related foreign body to cause airway obstruction. Choking on fish was responsible for about 4,500 reported accidents in the United Kingdom in 1998.

Allergens

A seafood allergy is a food allergy to allergens which can be present in fish. This can result in an overreaction of the immune system and lead to severe physical symptoms from urticaria to angioedema and distributive shock. Allergic reactions can result from ingesting seafood, or by breathing in vapours from preparing or cooking seafood. The most severe allergic reaction is anaphylaxis, a medical emergency requiring immediate attention and is treated urgently with epinephrine.

Biotoxins

Some species of fish, notably the fugu pufferfish used for sushi, can result in serious food poisoning if not prepared properly. These fish always contain toxins as a natural defense against predators; it is not present due to environmental circumstances. Particularly, fugu has a lethal dose of tetrodotoxin in its internal organs and must be prepared by a licensed fugu chef who has passed the national examination in Japan. Ciguatera poisoning can occur from eating larger fish from warm tropical waters, such as sea bass, grouper, barracuda and red snapper. Scombroid poisoning can result from eating large oily fish which have sat around for too long before being refrigerated or frozen. This includes scombroids such as tuna and mackerel, but can also include non-scombroids such as mahi-mahi and amberjack. The poison is often odourless and tasteless.

Many fish eat algae and other organisms that contain biotoxins, which are defensive substances against predators. Biotoxins accumulated in fish/shellfish include brevetoxins, okadaic acid, saxitoxins, ciguatoxin and domoic acid. Except for ciguatoxine, high levels of these toxins are only found in shellfish. Both domoic acid and ciguatoxine can be deadly to humans; the others will only cause diarrhea, dizziness and a (temporary) feeling of claustrophobia.

Shellfish are filter feeders and, therefore, accumulate toxins produced by microscopic algae, such as dinoflagellates and diatoms, and cyanobacteria. There are four syndromes called shellfish poisoning which can result in humans, sea mammals and seabirds from the ingestion of toxic shellfish. These are primarily associated with bivalve molluscs, such as mussels, clams, oysters and scallops. Fish like anchovies can also concentrate toxins such as domoic acid. If suspected, medical attention should be sought.

The  toxins responsible for most shellfish and fish poisonings, including ciguatera and scombroid poisoning, are heat-resistant to the point where conventional cooking methods do not eliminate them.

Mercury and other toxic metals

Fish products, especially those from apex and higher-order consumers up the food chain, have been shown to contain varying amounts of heavy or toxic metals due to biomagnification. Toxicity is a function of solubility, and insoluble compounds often exhibit negligible toxicity. Organometallic forms such as dimethyl mercury and tetraethyl lead can be extremely toxic.

According to the US Food and Drug Administration (FDA), the risk from mercury by eating fish and shellfish is not a health concern for most people. However, certain seafood contains sufficient mercury to harm an unborn baby or young child's developing nervous system. The FDA makes three recommendations for child-bearing women and young children:
 Do not eat shark, swordfish, king mackerel, or tilefish because they contain high levels of mercury.
 Eat up to 12 ounces (2 average meals) a week of a variety of fish and shellfish that are lower in mercury. Four of the most commonly eaten fish that are low in mercury are canned light tuna, salmon, pollock, and catfish. Another commonly eaten fish, albacore ("white tuna") has more mercury than canned light tuna. So, when choosing your two meals of fish and shellfish, you may eat up to 6 ounces (one average meal) of albacore tuna per week.
 Check local advisories about the safety of fish caught by family and friends in your local lakes, rivers, and coastal areas. If no advice is available, eat up to 6 ounces (one average meal) per week of fish you catch from local waters, but don't consume any other fish during that week.

These recommendations are also advised when feeding fish and shellfish to young children, but in smaller portions.

Mislabelling
When the ocean conservation organization Oceana examined over 1,200 seafood samples of seafood sold in the U.S between 2010 and 2012, they found one-third were mislabelled. The highest rate of mislabelling occurred with snapper at 87 percent, followed by tuna at 57 percent.

Persistent organic pollutants

If fish and shellfish inhabit polluted waters, they can accumulate other toxic chemicals, particularly fat-soluble pollutants containing chlorine or bromine, dioxins or PCBs. Fish that is to be eaten should be caught in unpolluted water. Some organisations such as SeafoodWatch, RIKILT, Environmental Defense Fund, IMARES provide information on species that do not accumulate much toxins/metals.

Parasites

Parasites in fish are a natural occurrence and common. Though not a health concern in thoroughly cooked fish, parasites are a concern when consumers eat raw or lightly preserved fish such as sashimi, sushi, ceviche and gravlax. The popularity of such raw fish dishes makes it important for consumers to be aware of this risk.

Traditionally, fish that live all or part of their lives in fresh water were considered unsuitable for sashimi due to the possibility of parasites (see Sashimi article). Parasitic infections from freshwater fish are a serious problem in some parts of the world, particularly Southeast Asia. Fish that spend part of their life cycle in brackish or fresh water, like salmon (which really are anadromous coastal trout), are a particular problem. A study in Seattle, Washington showed that 100% of wild salmon had roundworm larvae capable of infecting people. In the same study farm-raised salmon did not have any roundworm larvae.

Parasite infection by raw fish is rare in the developed world (fewer than 40 cases per year in the United States), and involves mainly three kinds of parasites: Clonorchis sinensis (a trematode/fluke), Anisakis (a nematode/roundworm) and Diphyllobothrium (a cestode/tapeworm). Infection risk of Anisakis is particularly higher in fishes which may have lived in a river or estuary, such as salmon (sa ke in Japanese cuisine) or mackerel (sa ba in Japanese cuisine). Such parasite infections can generally be avoided by boiling, grilling, preserving in salt or vinegar, or deep-freezing. In Japan, it is common to eat raw salmon and ikura (roe), but these foods are frozen overnight prior to eating to prevent infections from parasites, particularly Anisakis.

Pescetarianism

 
The neologism "pescetarian" covers those who eat fish and other seafood, but not mammals and birds. 

A 1999 metastudy combined data from five studies from western countries. The metastudy reported mortality ratios, where lower numbers indicated fewer deaths, for pescetarians to be 0.82, vegetarians to be 0.84, and occasional meat eaters to be 0.84. Regular meat eaters and vegans shared the highest mortality ratio of 1.00. However, the "lower mortality was due largely to the relatively low prevalence of smoking in these [vegetarian] cohorts".

Since fish is animal flesh, the Vegetarian Society has stated that vegetarian diets cannot contain fish.

In religion

Religious rites and rituals regarding food also tend to classify the birds of the air and the fish of the sea separately from land-bound mammals. Jewish(kosher) practice treats fish differently from other animal foods. The distinction between fish and "meat" is codified by the Jewish dietary law of kashrut, regarding the mixing of milk and meat, which does not forbid the mixing of milk and fish. Modern Jewish legal practice (halakha) on kashrut classifies the flesh of both mammals and birds as "meat"; fish are considered to be parve, neither meat nor a dairy food. (The preceding portion refers only to the halakha of Ashkenazi Jews; Sephardic Jews do not mix fish with dairy.)

Ichthys has become a symbol of Christianity since ancient times. In the New Testament Luke 24 – Jesus's eating of a fish [] and Jesus telling his disciples where to catch fish, before cooking it for them to eat. Seasonal religious prohibitions against eating meat do not usually include fish. For example, non-fish meat was forbidden during Lent and on all Fridays of the year in pre-Vatican II Roman Catholicism, but fish was permitted (as were eggs). (See Fasting in Catholicism.) In Eastern Orthodoxy, fish is permitted on some fast days when other meat is forbidden, but stricter fast days also prohibit fish with spines, while permitting invertebrate seafood such as shrimp and oysters, considering them "fish without blood".

Some Buddhists and Hindus (Brahmins of West Bengal, Odisha and Saraswat Brahmins of the Konkan) abjure meat that is not fish. Muslim (halal) practice also treats fish differently from other animal foods, as it can be eaten.

Environmental impact of fish consumption

Taboos on eating fish

Among the Somali people, most clans have a taboo against the consumption of fish, and do not intermarry with the few occupational clans that do eat it.

There are taboos on eating fish among many upland pastoralists and agriculturalists (and even some coastal peoples) inhabiting parts of southeastern Egypt, Ethiopia, Eritrea, Somalia, Kenya, and northern Tanzania. This is sometimes referred to as the "Cushitic fish-taboo", as Cushitic speakers are believed to have been responsible for the introduction of fish avoidance to East Africa, though not all Cushitic groups avoid fish. The zone of the fish taboo roughly coincides with the area where Cushitic languages are spoken, and as a general rule, speakers of Nilo-Saharan and Semitic languages do not have this taboo, and indeed many are watermen. The few Bantu and Nilotic groups in East Africa that do practice fish avoidance also reside in areas where Cushites appear to have lived in earlier times. Within East Africa, the fish taboo is found no further than Tanzania. This is attributed to the local presence of the tsetse fly and in areas beyond, which likely acted as a barrier to further southern migrations by wandering pastoralists, the principal fish-avoiders. Zambia and Mozambique's Bantus were therefore spared subjugation by pastoral groups, and they consequently nearly all consume fish.

There is also another center of fish avoidance in Southern Africa, among mainly Bantu speakers. It is not clear whether this disinclination developed independently or whether it was introduced. It is certain, however, that no avoidance of fish occurs among southern Africa's earliest inhabitants, the Khoisan. Nevertheless, since the Bantu of southern Africa also share various cultural traits with the pastoralists further north in East Africa, it is believed that, at an unknown date, the taboo against the consumption of fish was similarly introduced from East Africa by cattle-herding peoples who somehow managed to get their livestock past the aforementioned tsetse fly endemic regions.

Certain species of fish are also forbidden in Judaism such as the freshwater eel (Anguillidae) and all species of catfish. Although they live in water, they appear to have no fins or scales (except under a microscope) (see Leviticus 11:10–13). Sunni Muslim laws are more flexible in this and catfish and shark are generally seen as halal as they are special types of fish. Eel is generally considered permissible in the four Sunni madh'hab, but the Ja'fari jurisprudence followed by most Shia Muslims forbids it.

Many tribes of the Southwestern United States, including the Navaho, Apache, and Zuñi, have a taboo against fish and other water-related animals, including waterfowl.

Dishes

 Bokkoms
 Bouillabaisse
 Bourdeto
 Ceviche
 Cioppino
 Crab stick
 Crappit heid
 Croquette
 Curanto
 Dressed herring
 Fish and chips
 Fish ball
 Fish chowder
 Fish slice
 Fishcake
 Fishstick
 Gefilte fish
 Kamaboko
 Kipper
 Lox
 Machher Jhol
 Paella
 Poke (Hawaii)
 Pompano en Papillote
 Quenelles Lyonnaises
 Rakfisk
 Remoulade
 Rissole
 Sashimi
 Seafood birdsnest
 Smoked salmon
 Soused herring
 Stargazy pie
 Surimi
 Surströmming
 Sushi
 Tuna fish sandwich
 Ukha

See also

 Anisakis
 Boneless Fish
 Boning knife
 Fish head
 Fish products
 Fishmonger
 Got Mercury?
 Ichthyoallyeinotoxism
 Kudoa thyrsites
 List of fish dishes
 Lists of foods
 List of commercially important fish species
 List of seafood dishes
 Oily fish
 Maguro bōchō
 Pescetarianism
 Phosphatidylserine
 Seafood Watch

References

Bibliography
 Aquamedia, "Consumption of Fishery Products" retrieved from https://web.archive.org/web/20060223203558/http://www.feap.info/economics/Tradebalance_en.asp on 2007-09-17.
 Paston-Williams, Sara (2006) Fish: Recipes from a Busy Island National Trust Books. .
 Sweetser, Wendy (2009) The Connoisseur's Guide to Fish & Seafood Sterling Publishing Company,. .
 
 University of Michigan Health System, "Fish & Seafood" retrieved from https://web.archive.org/web/20070526011755/http://www.med.umich.edu/umim/clinical/pyramid/fish.htm on 2007-09-17.
 VegDining.com, "Frequently Asked Questions-Definitions" retrieved from http://www.ivu.org/faq/definitions.html on 2007-09-17.
World Health Organization.

External links

Science Daily Benefits Of Eating Fish Greatly Outweigh The Risks, New Study Says
Science Daily Experts Say Consumers Can Eat Around Toxins In Fish
Scientific American Soy and fish protect from cancer: study.

 
Types of food
Fish products
Meat by animal